Martin Trygve Mork (20 May 1933 – 19 March 2017) was a Norwegian oceanographer.

He was born in Kristiansund. He became a professor of theoretical oceanography at the University of Bergen in 1972 and a fellow of the Norwegian Academy of Science and Letters in 1974.

References

1933 births
2017 deaths
People from Kristiansund
Academic staff of the University of Bergen
Norwegian oceanographers
Members of the Norwegian Academy of Science and Letters